The surprisingly popular answer is a wisdom of the crowd technique that taps into the expert minority opinion within a crowd. For a given question, a group is asked both "What do you think the right answer is?" and "What do you think the popular answer will be?" The answer that maximizes the average difference between the "right" answer and the "popular" answer is the "surprisingly popular" answer. The term "surprisingly popular" was coined in a 2017 paper published in Nature entitled "A solution to the single-question crowd wisdom problem", which outlined the technique.

Example

Suppose the question to be determined is: Is Philadelphia the capital of Pennsylvania? The two questions asked of the group, and the numbers of responses, are:

 Is Philadelphia the capital of Pennsylvania?
 Yes: 65%
 No: 35%
 What do you think most people will respond to that question?
 Yes: 75%
 No: 25%

The difference between the answers to the right question and the popular question:
 Yes: 65% − 75% = −10%
 No: 35% − 25% = 10%

Thus, the No answer is surprisingly popular (10% > −10%). Because of the relatively high margin of 10%, there can be high confidence that the correct answer is No. (The capital is indeed not Philadelphia, but Harrisburg.)

An illustrative breakdown of this follows. There are four groups of people.
 A - "Philadelphia is the capital, and others will agree." (This group answers yes/yes.)
 B - "Philadelphia is the capital, but most others won't know that". (This group answers yes/no.)
 C - "Philadelphia is not the capital, and others will agree." (This group answers no/no.)
 D - "Philadelphia is not the capital, but most others won't know that." (This group answers no/yes.)

This technique causes groups A and C to be eliminated from consideration and measures the difference in size between groups B and D.

Both groups B and D think they know something other people don't, but B is wrong and D is right. In cases where people feel like they have "inside" knowledge, it's more often the case that it's because they are correct and knowledgeable (group D), not because they are misled (group B).

See also
 Keynesian beauty contest
 Guess 2/3 of the average
 Family Feud
Focal point (game theory), also known as Schelling point

References

Further reading

Crowdsourcing
Social information processing
Knowledge
Crowds